Richard Macy Noyes (April 6, 1919 – November 25, 1997) was an American physical chemist.

Family 
Noyes was born April 6, 1919 in Champaign, Illinois to the American chemist William Noyes and his third wife Katherine Macy, daughter of Jesse Macy.  His older half-brother was Albert (1898–1980) and his brother Pierre (1923 - 2016); both were chemists.

Education 
He graduated from Harvard College and California Institute of Technology.

Career 
In 1959 Noyes became Professor of Chemistry at the University of Oregon. His research area was focused on the kinetic studies of oscillating reactions. Together with Richard J. Field and Endre Kőrös, he developed a model (FKN mechanism) in 1972 to describe the Belousov–Zhabotinsky reaction. In 1976, he was able to identify the reaction mechanism of the Bray–Liebhafsky reaction.

Noyes has received numerous honors and awards. He received the Guggenheim Fellowship in 1955 and the Fulbright Research Fellowship in 1964. 1978 and 1979 he was awarded with the Alexander von Humboldt Senior American Scientist Award. It was elected in 1977 as a member of the National Academy of Sciences and in 1989 elected as a member of the American Academy of Arts and Sciences. During his career he published 190 scientific articles in various journals. He was also associate editor of the Journal of Physical Chemistry. On his 70th birthday he was honored by the Journal with a Festschrift.

He died on November 25, 1997.

See also 
 Oscillating reaction
 Oregonator

Works
 1985 (with P. G. Bowers). Gas evolution oscillators. In Oscillations and Traveling Waves in Chemical Systems, eds. RJ Field and M. Burger, pp. 473–92. New York: Wiley-Interscience.
 1986th Kinetics and mechanisms of complex reactions. In Investigations of Rates and Mechanisms of Reactions, vol. 6, part 1, ed C. F. Bernasconi, pp. 373–423. New York: John Wiley & Sons.

References

External links
 

1919 births
1997 deaths
University of Oregon alumni
University of Oregon faculty
20th-century American chemists
People from Champaign, Illinois
Harvard College alumni
California Institute of Technology alumni
Members of the United States National Academy of Sciences
Fellows of the American Physical Society